Ansitz Kreit is an Ansitz in Eppan an der Weinstraße, South Tyrol, Italy.

History 
Ansitz Kreit is located in the frazione of St. Michael in the municipality of Eppan an der Weinstraße. The main house was built by a farmer named Elias Leys around 1596, converting the farm into an estate. A Catholic chapel, dedicated to Saint Anthony, was built in 1661.

Ownership changed to the Zeffer family in the middle of the 17th century. The family was later ennobled, becoming von Zephyris von Greith. The last member of the family to own the estate was a Catholic priest. As he had no heirs, ownership changed after his death. Kreit has been owned by the Raifer family since 1898.

Ansitz Kreit has also been known as Ansitz Straussenhof.

References 

Buildings and structures in South Tyrol
Farms in Italy
Houses completed in 1596
Houses in Italy
Wineries of Italy
1596 establishments in the Holy Roman Empire
1596 establishments in Italy